The Imamate of Futa Jallon or Jalon (or  ) was a West African theocratic state based in the Fouta Djallon highlands of modern Guinea. The state was founded around 1727 by a Fulani jihad and became part of French West Africa in 1896.

Origins 
The Fouta Djallon region was settled by the semi-nomadic Fulɓe over successive generations between the 13th and 16th centuries. Initially, they followed a traditional African religion. In the 16th century an influx of Muslim Fulɓe from Macina, Mali changed the fabric of Fula society.

As in the Imamate of Futa Toro, the Muslim and traditionalist Fula of Futa Jallon lived side-by-side. Then, according to traditional accounts, a 17th-century holy war erupted. In 1725, the Muslim Fulɓe took complete control of Futa Jallon after the battle of Talansan and set up the first of many Fula theocratic states to come. Karamokho Alfa was appointed Emir al-Mu'minin ("Commander of the Faithful") and first Almami of the Imamate of Futa Jalon. He died in 1751 and was succeeded by Emir Ibrahim Sori (died 1791), who consolidated the power of the Islamic state.  Sori's death caused the imamate of Futa Jallon to disintegrate into a federation of nine autonomous provinces with constant succession disputes over who had the right to be imam. Eventually, the leading Soriya and Alfaya families agreed to alternate the imamate amongst them.

Futa Jallon soon began slave raiding throughout the region, selling the slaves to European trading houses on the coast, or settling the slaves (hubbu) in agricultural colonies called runde. By the mid-19th century, slaves made up half of Futa Jallon's population. Futa Jallon's theocratic model would later inspire the Fula state of Futa Toro.

Organization

The new Imamate of Futa Jallon was governed under a strict interpretation of Sharia with a central ruler in the city of Timbo, near present-day Mamou. The Imamate contained nine provinces called diwe, which all held a certain amount of autonomy. These diwe were: Timbo, Timbi, Labè, Koîn, Kolladhè, Fugumba, Kèbaly, Fodé Hadji and Murya, Massi. The meeting of the rulers of these diwè at Timbi decided to introduce Alpha Ibrahima from Timbo as first Almamy Fuuta Jallonke with residence at Timbo. Timbo then became the capital of Fuuta Jallon until the arrival of French colonialists. The objective of the constitution of this Imamate was to convince local communities to become Muslim. It became a regional power through war and negotiation, wielding influence and generating wealth. As a sovereign state, it dealt with France and other European powers as a diplomatic peer while championing artistic and literary achievement in Islamic learning at centers such as the holy city of Fugumba.

The Muslims of Futa Jallon became divided into factions. The clerical faction took the name of the Alfaya out of respect to the legacy of Karamokho Alfa, while the secular faction called themselves the Soriya after his successor Ibrahima Sori.

The two factions came to an agreement that power should alternate between leaders of the two factions, with each faction's chosen almami serving in alternating two-year terms. The rulers of the two cities of Timbo and Fugumba were descended from the same original family, and later all competition for the position of almami was between these two cities.

Dominance

At his height, the Imamate of Futa Jallon became a multiethnic, multilingual society, ruled by Muslim Fulɓe and one of the most powerful state in West Africa, backed by powerful free and slave armies. The Fulɓe of Futa Jallon and Futa Toro were able to take advantage of the growing Atlantic slave trade with the Europeans on the coast, particularly the French and Portuguese. The twin Fula states also supplied valuable grain, cattle and other goods to their European neighbors on the coast. The Almaami would demand gifts in return for trade rights and could enforce his will with a well-supplied army. In 1865, Futa Jallon supported an invasion of the Mandinka kingdom of Kaabu, resulting in its demise at the Battle of Kansala in 1867. It conquered the remnants of the Kingdom of Jolof in central Senegambia in 1875. Futa Djalon wanted to conquer and expand with but Mama Jankeh Wali Sanneh did not agree and wanted them to leave West Africa just as it is with each family ruling over their own people, so to conquer Futa Djalon attacked Kaabu so they could pursue their imperial goals, after the death of Mama Jankeh Wali Sanneh (AS), the Almami of Futa Djalon married his daughter.

Decline
The French were not satisfied with mere dominance of the coast and increasingly one-sided trade with the Fulbe. They began making inroads into Futa Jallon by capitalizing on its internal struggles. In 1881, spurred by tentative British moves in the region, they negotiated a treaty with the Futa Jallon leadership that they presented internationally as representing the establishment of a French protectorate over the region, though the two Almamis seem not to have understood it to be so. By 1889, other international powers had accepted Futa Jallon as falling within the French sphere of influence. The French aimed to strengthen their control in the region as a potential inland bridge from their possessions in the Senegambia to their other territories to the south and east, but were resisted diplomatically by the Almamis. One prong of their resistance focussed on contesting the French representation of the 1881 treaty as any sort of surrender of autonomy, and the French eventually acceded to their interpretation in a second treaty in 1893. In parallel, they increased pressure on the French by supporting resistance movements in other areas where the French were trying to extend or strengthen their influence, such as that of Mandinka leader Samori Ture. Eventually, the French were able to drive Samori south, out of contact with Futa Jallon and its assistance.

The Almamis also held out the spectre of closer relations with the British in Sierra Leone as a threat against the French, first having established a trading relationship before the disputed 1881 French treaty. The British, however, would recognize the region as part of the French sphere in 1889, and thus had no intention of further intervening, and terminated the trade relationship entirely in 1895, depriving the almamis of another weapon to use against the French.  withdrawing another weapon from the almani's . ir disputed 1881 treaty with the French, though once the British had recognized Futa Jallon as part of the French sphere, they declined to get involved. the British and would as a counterweight to French dominance. French-controlled areas, regions., but the relief was only short-lived. The Almanis also became adept at playing the separate French colonial administrations against each other. This tool for resisting the French was also removed in 1895, by the creation of a coordinated French West African colonial authority.

The French had committed to a peaceful expansion into Futa Jallon, and the Almami took advantage of this commitment. They leveraging the complicated structure of the government of the Imamate itself, with the alternating control, not only of the central government but of the individual provinces between the two factions, plus a check provided by the council of elders, as a pretext to delay Frances diplomatic initiatives by requiring further consultation, often sending French envoys back and forth between the factions, or insisting that consultation with the council or provinces was necessary before any agreement could be ratified. In so doing, the successfully killed several French initiatives.  In particular, the ostensibly pro-French Soriya Almami Bokar Biro frustrated them with his duplicity.

In the end, it was the dissolution of the Futa Jalon state that doomed its independence. After taking control of the Soriya Almami role in 1890 by assassinating his brother, who was the designated successor, Bokar Biro moved to strengthen central control over the provinces, and the provincial leaders resisted, some pushing for full independence. The resulting civil war saw the Almami's army routed by a coalition of two provincial leaders in 1895, though he was able to restore himself with French help. The provincial heads began to turn to the French for intercession against Bokar Biro's excesses, and when it finally became clear in 1896 that his promises to them were hollow, the French began to actively foment dissention between the central government and the provinces. Bokar Boro's ambition to be sole ruler alienated the Alfaya faction, but there was also dissention within the Soriya, who had not forgiven him for seizing power by murdering his own brother, and who also resented his moves toward stronger centralization. Alfaya Almami, Hamadu, died in 1896, and the Soriya Almami made moves to resist handing over control at the end of his term. He tried to assassinate the Almaya's selected heir, Omaru Bademba, and when that failed, he propped up two Alfaya rivals. Bademba, who was pro-French and thus threatened Bokar Biro's exclusive relationship with them, fought a successful battle against his rivals, then attacked Bokar Biro himself, but was defeated. He fled to the French, who decided to take advantage of the divisions within Futa Jallon between the Soriya Almami and the provincial governors, the Alfaya faction, and his own factions, and, citing his refusal to turn over the reigns of government at the end of his term as a pretext, they intervened to depose Bokar Biro. They marched into Timbo without resistance, and in November 1896, a small detachment of better-armed French soldiers routed Bokar Biro's army at the Battle of Porédaka and he was killed by Bademba's men as he fled. This ended Futa Jallon's resistance, and though the French installed Bokar's cousin, Sori El Eli, and Bademba as Soriya and Alfaya Almamis, they now served as French clients rather than as independent rulers.

See also
History of Guinea
Fula people
Kaabu Empire
Battle of Kansala

References
Notes

Citations

Sources

External links
WebFuuta
Jamtan
webPulaaku

Countries in precolonial Africa
History of Guinea
History of Guinea-Bissau
Former monarchies of Africa
History of Senegal
French West Africa
Fula history
1896 disestablishments
States and territories established in 1725
Former theocracies